Barbodes everetti, the Clown barb or Everett's barb is a species of cyprinid fish native to Borneo and Sumatra. Its diet consists of small crustaceans, worms, insects and plant material. This species can reach a length of  TL. It can also be found in the aquarium trade.

See also
List of freshwater aquarium fish species

References 

Barbodes
Barbs (fish)
Fish described in 1894